Sensitization is an example of non-associative learning.

Sensitization may also refer to:

 Sensitization (immunology), a concept in immunology
 Sensitization effect, the creation of galvanic corrosion cells within the microstructure of an alloy
 Drug sensitization, also called Reverse tolerance
 "Sensitized", a song by Kylie Minogue from X

See also

 Sensitivity (disambiguation)
 Sensitizer (disambiguation)